Aniwa may refer to:

Places
A town and village in Shawano County, Wisconsin, in the US:
 Aniwa (town)
 Village of Aniwa
Aniwa Island, an island in Tafea province, Vanuatu

Ships
USS Aniwa (ID-3146), a US Navy cargo ship in commission from 1918 to 1919

See also
Aniva